13D, 13d or XIII-D may refer to:
 Rule 13D, United States Securities and Exchange Commission rule
 Schedule 13d, United States Securities and Exchange Commission rule
 Stalag XIII-D, a German Army World War II prisoner-of-war camp in Nürnberg
 13D Research, an institutional global research firm